WHKP is a radio station broadcasting at 1450 on the AM dial in Hendersonville, North Carolina. The call letters stand for Where the Heavens Kiss the Peaks.

The station broadcasts to most of the area in Henderson County and parts of southern Buncombe and parts of northern Polk Counties.

The current format is mostly Real Country and conservative talk and local programming of a conservative nature. Syndicated programming includes Rush Limbaugh and once included Paul Harvey. The station also airs area high school sports.

History
Station owner Kermit Edney hosted one of Western North Carolina's most popular morning shows from 1947 to 1991, when he sold to Radio Henderson Inc. When the station celebrated its 50th anniversary in 1996, Edney was named to the North Carolina Association of Broadcasters Hall of Fame, and a bronze bust of Edney was placed in the FitzSimons Historical Room at the Henderson County Public Library. The Kermit Edney Musical Library was established by WHKP employees.

An Easter Sunrise Service at Chimney Rock Park has aired on WHKP every year since it started in 1956.

Actor and Western Carolina University associate dean Steve Carlisle hosted "It's All about Life," a weekly program.

After 33 years, Al Hope left WHKP's morning show in 2006, replaced by news director and "Open Line Hendersonville" host Larry Freeman, who had worked at the station 40 years. At that time, the station once again began airing adult standards music from the Music of Your Life network at night. Tippy Creswell, who had worked at the station since 1978, would be co-hosting the late morning show with newcomer Abby Ramsey.

After 8 years on WWNC, Matt Mittan began a show on WHKP which aired weekdays from 5 to 6 P.M. starting December 5, 2011.

Translators

References

External links
Official website

HKP
Country radio stations in the United States
Radio stations established in 1947
1947 establishments in North Carolina